The 1997 CONCACAF Champions' Cup was the 33rd. edition of the annual international club football competition held in the CONCACAF region (North America, Central America and the Caribbean), the CONCACAF Champions' Cup. It determined that year's club champion of association football in the CONCACAF region.

The teams were split into 3 zones (North, Central and Caribbean). The North American zone qualified 3 teams direct into the quarterfinals and 2 teams played a play-off to get a 4th spot in the quarterfinals. The Central American zone played a regional tournament to get 3 spots in the quarterfinal. The winner of the Caribbean zone got a place in the quarterfinals.

1997 was the first year that teams from the United States' premier league, Major League Soccer, took part in the Champions' Cup. The competitors in the MLS Cup, both winner and runner-up, were each given berths in the tournament.

All but two of the eight games played in the final tournament were played in Washington, D.C.. The final was won by Cruz Azul, who captured their fifth Champions' Cup title with a 5–3 victory over the Los Angeles Galaxy. The Galaxy were the first American club to reach the final of a Champions' Cup since 1984.

Preliminary Regional playoffs

North American Zone

|}
Los Angeles Galaxy advance to the quarterfinal.

{{Football box collapsible
| date       = July 30, 1997
| time       = 
| round      = 
| team1      = Los Angeles Galaxy 
| score      = 4:1 (0:0)
| report     = 
| team2      =  Santos Laguna
| goals1     = Mauricio Cienfuegos Eduardo Hurtado Martín Machón Welton Mello 
| goals2     = Nicolás Ramírez  
| location   = Los Angeles 
| stadium    = Rose Bowl
| attendance = 
| referee    = 
| nobars     = Y
| note       = 
}}

Central American Zone
Preliminary round

|}

First round

|}

Second round

|}
Comunicaciones, Luis Ángel Firpo and Cartaginés advance to the quarterfinal. Cartaginés vs Alajuelense played in one leg in San José.

Caribbean Zone
1997 CFU Club Championship

Group 1

|}

Group 2

          
 

 
 

|}

Qualifying playoff

 
|}
United Petrotrin advance to the quarterfinal.

 Quarterfinal Qualified teams 
 North American zone Major League Soccer: D.C. United - 1996 MLS Cup winner Los Angeles Galaxy - 1996 MLS Cup Runner UpPrimera División de México: Guadalajara - 1997 Verano winner Cruz Azul - 1996 CONCACAF Champions League Title Holders

 Central American zone Central American Qualifiers: C.S. Cartaginés - Second Round Series winner C.D. Luis Ángel Firpo - Second Round Series winner  CSD Comunicaciones - Second Round Series winner

 Caribbean zone Caribbean Football Union (CFU): United Petrotrin - 1997 CFU Club Championship winner

 Bracket 

 Quarterfinals 

 Semifinals 

Third place matchThird place was shared.'''

Final

Champion

References

CONCACAF Champions' Cup
c
c
c